"If You Want It" is a song by Niteflyte. It was released in 1979 as a single from their debut self-titled album.

The song is the band's only Top 40 hit on the Billboard Hot 100 and Billboard's Hot Soul Singles charts, peaking at No. 37 and No. 21 respectively. In 2021, it was sampled by Flamingosis in his track "Cosmic Feeling".

Chart performance

References

1979 singles
1979 songs
Ariola Records singles